Zangeneh-ye Bon Rud (also Romanized as Zangeneh-ye Bon Rūd; also known as Zangeneh) is a village in Dasht-e Arzhan Rural District, Arzhan District, Shiraz County, Fars Province, Iran. At the 2006 census, its population was 787, in 173 families.

References 

Populated places in Shiraz County